Lanark United Football Club are a Scottish football club based in the town of Lanark, South Lanarkshire. Nicknamed the Yowes, they were formed in 1920, and play at Moor Park.

The team are managed since September 2014 by former St Johnstone and Hamilton Accies striker John Brogan.

Non-playing staff

Board
As of 30 June 2011.

Management
As of 23 September 2014.

Honours

Central League Division 1

 Winners: 1996–97, 2000–01

Central League Division 2

 Winners: 1984–85, 1995–96

Other Honours

 West of Scotland Cup Winners: 1976–77
 Central League C Division Winners: 1969–70
 Lanarkshire Junior Cup: 1926–27, 1934–35
 Lanarkshire Hozier Cup: 1923–24, 1924–25, 1925–26, 1959–60
 Central League Cup: 1975–76, 2006–07
 Central (Beatons Coaches) Sectional League Cup: 1975–76
 Evening Times Cup Winners: 2004–05
 Clydesdale Cup Winners: 2008–09, 2009–10

See also
:Category:Lanark United F.C. players

References

External links 
 Facebook
 

Lanark
Football clubs in Scotland
Scottish Junior Football Association clubs
Association football clubs established in 1920
Football in South Lanarkshire
1920 establishments in Scotland
West of Scotland Football League teams